Pyaar Mein Twist is an Indian comedy-drama series on Star Plus, produced by Neela Tele Films Private Limited. The series premiered on 29 January 2011. It is a comedy that tells the story of a geeky, humble and a simple boy Amol and a loving, bubbly and total filmy girl Rekha. Pyaar Mein Twist is about a lovely "made for each other" couple – who love each other a lot but end up fighting with each other because of others.

Plot

The show revolves around a geek named Amol (Manish Paul)and a hot girl called Rekha (Roshni Chopra). Amol is a nerdy guy who first meets Rekha at a camp after college ends and he tries to save Rekha from some goons. Rekha starts liking Amol from the day of the campfire. When Rekha's mother wants Rekha to marry Rohit ,the guy who left Rekha with the goons the day of the campfire, she refuses.

Rekha's mother tells her to chooses between three pictures or else she will have to marry Rohit. Since she doesn't want to marry any of them she proposes to Amol who loves her a lot. They marry without anyone knowing.

The rest of the show navigates through Amol and Rekha's lives as e people try to separate them the best way they can.

Cast
Manish Paul as Amol
Roshni Chopra as Rekha
Vishal Kotian
Bharti Singh
Rakesh Bedi
Azaan Rustam Shah
Prasad Barve

References

External links

StarPlus original programming
Indian television series
2011 Indian television series endings
2011 Indian television series debuts